Gabriel 'Gabe' Nyenhuis (born June 26, 1981) is a former professional gridiron football defensive lineman.  His nickname at the San Jose SaberCats according to some fans is Hunger Games, as he is seen reading the books during practice. He was named AFL Defensive Player of the Year as well as Lineman of the Year in 2010. He was signed as an undrafted free agent by the Seattle Seahawks in 2004. He played college football for the Colorado Buffaloes.

Nyenhuis was also a member of the Jacksonville Jaguars, Atlanta Falcons, Indianapolis Colts, Philadelphia Soul, Saskatchewan Roughriders, Dallas Vigilantes and Tulsa Talons.

Professional career

Seattle Seahawks
Nyenhuis went undrafted in the 2004 NFL Draft and was signed by the Seattle Seahawks on April 30, 2004. He was released as a late training camp cut on August 31.

Jacksonville Jaguars
On September 7, 2004, the Jacksonville Jaguars signed Nyenhuis to their practice squad.

Indianapolis Colts
He re-signed on January 24, 2006.

He was released on August 18, 2006.

Saskatchewan Roughriders
Nyenhuis signed with the Saskatchewan Roughriders on April 15, 2009. He was released on September 16.

Philadelphia Soul
In 2007, Nyenhuis signed with the Philadelphia Soul of the Arena Football League. Nyenhuis would play two years with the Soul, posting 9.5 sacks in 2008 to lead the Soul.

Tulsa Talons
In 2010, Nyenhuis signed with the Tulsa Talons. Nyenhuis posted career highs in tackles (19) and sacks (15.5) on his way to winning the Arena Football League Defensive Player of the Year Award.

San Jose SaberCats
Since 2011, Nyenhuis has played for the San Jose SaberCats. He has yet to replicate his 2010 season.

References

External links
Colorado bio
Indianapolis Colts bio
Saskatchewan Roughriders bio

1981 births
Living people
People from St. Charles, Illinois
American players of Canadian football
American football defensive linemen
Canadian football defensive linemen
Colorado Buffaloes football players
Seattle Seahawks players
Jacksonville Jaguars players
Atlanta Falcons players
Indianapolis Colts players
Philadelphia Soul players
Saskatchewan Roughriders players
Tulsa Talons players
San Jose SaberCats players
Garden City Broncbusters football players
Dallas Vigilantes players